Lakeside is a provincial electoral division in Manitoba, Canada.  It is located to the immediate northwest of the city of Winnipeg.

Traditionally a rural riding, Lakeside has become more urban in recent years (as a result of both electoral redistribution and changes in demography).  All the same, agriculture accounted for 17 per cent of the riding's industry in 1999.  The riding is bordered to the north by Interlake, to the west by Portage la Prairie, to the south by Morris and to the east by Gimli.  It also borders the city of Winnipeg to the southeast.

There are no major urban centres in the riding.  Communities include Argyle, Balmoral, Rosser, Gunton, Stonewall, Stony Mountain, Teulon, Warren, Woodlands and Inwood.

Lakeside's population in 1996 was 19,473.  The average family income in 1999 was Can$49,774, with an unemployment rate of 6.10 per cent.  Eight per cent of the population is of a German background, and 8 per cent are aboriginal.

Lakeside was created by provincial redistribution in 1886.  It has traditionally elected representatives of agrarian interests, both of the Liberal and Progressive Conservative parties. It is presently a comfortably safe seat for the Tories, who have held it without interruption since 1969. Since 1922, only three men have held the seat.

Lakeside's best-known Member of the Legislative Assembly (MLA), Douglas Campbell, represented the constituency for 47 years, first as a Progressive, then as a Liberal-Progressive, then as a Liberal—longer than anyone in provincial history.  He served as premier from 1949 to 1958.

List of provincial representatives

Electoral results

1886 general election

1888 general election

1892 general election

1896 general election

1896 by-election

1899 general election

1903 general election

1907 general election

1910 general election

1914 general election

1915 general election

1920 general election

1921 by-election

1922 general election

1927 general election

1932 general election

1936 general election

1941 general election

1945 general election

1949 general election

1953 general election

1958 general election

1959 general election

1962 general election

1966 general election

1969 general election

1973 general election

1977 general election

1981 general election

1986 general election

1988 general election

1990 general election

1995 general election

1999 general election

2003 general election

2007 general election

2011 general election

2016 general election

2019 general election

Previous boundaries

References

Manitoba provincial electoral districts